Adavoyle was a station in the rural townland of Adavoyle, near Dromintee, in County Armagh, Northern Ireland.

History
The station was opened in 1892 by the Dublin and Belfast Junction Railways, then absorbed into the Northern Railway of Ireland. Then it was taken over by the Great Northern Railway (Ireland). The station closed under this management in 1933.

On 24 June 1921, during the Irish War of Independence, the Irish Republican Army (IRA) derailed a British military train near the station. Four British soldiers were killed and twenty wounded. The attack was carried out by volunteers of the IRA's Fourth Northern Division, led by Frank Aiken. The soldiers had been returning from the opening of Northern Ireland's new parliament, which took place in Belfast two days before.

Future Taoiseach Éamon de Valera was ‘deported’ through this station by the Royal Ulster Constabulary in 1924 when he was arrested at the Canal Street police station, and put on the train to Dublin at Adavoyle.

The building is in ruins. A dwelling house has recently been built in the grounds of the station. The Dublin-Belfast railway line, including the Enterprise services, still passes the former platforms.

Modelling 
Tony Miles' Adavoyle Junction in 1963 was an important early model railway using the P4 Finescale standards. The desire to model a local broad gauge prototype, without commercial model support, meant that scratchbuilding was necessary anyway and so the adoption of P4 was less of a change than was seen by British standard gauge modellers.

The railway was somewhat fictionalised, as a larger junction with two GNR branches added to it: one running north-west to Monaghan, and the other south-east to a LNWR packet port at Greenore. A typical Irish 3 foot gauge narrow gauge line ran South to Inniskeen.

References 

Disused railway stations in County Armagh
Railway stations opened in 1892
Railway stations closed in 1933
1892 establishments in Ireland
1933 disestablishments in Northern Ireland
Railway stations in Northern Ireland opened in the 19th century